Murrish Glacier is a glacier about 15 nautical miles (28 km) long on the east side of Palmer Land. It drains east-northeast, to the north of Stockton Peak and Abendroth Peak, and merges with the north side of Gain Glacier before the latter enters the Weddell Sea opposite Morency Island. It was named by the Advisory Committee on Antarctic Names (US-ACAN) for David E. Murrish, United States Antarctic Research Program (USARP) biologist and party leader for the study of peripheral vascular control mechanisms in birds in the Antarctic Peninsula region for three seasons, 1972–75.

Glaciers of Palmer Land